The Institute for Democracy and Economic Affairs (IDEAS) is a Malaysian think tank dedicated to promoting solutions to public policy challenges. It was founded on 8 February 2010. IDEAS is headquartered at Jalan Hang Lekir, Kuala Lumpur.

History
The idea to establish an institute to debate public policy ideals was first mooted by Tunku 'Abidin Muhriz, Wan Saiful Wan Jan and Wan Mohd Firdaus Wan Mohd Fuaad in early 2006, who thought there was a need to promote liberal ideas to Malaysians in a more strategic and organised fashion. The think tank's founding is inspired by the vision of Tunku Abdul Rahman Putra al-Haj, the first Prime Minister of Malaysia, who stated in the 1957 Proclamation of Independence that Malaysia should:

In October 2006, the organisation was registered as a non-profit company limited by guarantee in England and Wales. The ‘working name’ of the organisation was Malaysia Think Tank London (MTTL), reflecting the founders' operations in London at that time. However, when organising activities in Malaysia, they dropped the word 'London' and used just Malaysia Think Tank (MTT).

In May 2009, the Executive Board decided that all operations would be fully moved from London to Malaysia, after given that sufficient groundwork had been laid. Wan Saiful Wan Jan was appointed as the Chief Executive in 1 October of the same year. After a comprehensive situational review on 14 December, the Executive Board decided to relaunch the organisation as the Institute for Democracy and Economic Affairs (IDEAS), a new name that clearly reflects the areas of their work. IDEAS is currently partnered with the Atlas Economic Research Foundation in Washington, D.C. and receives grants from the International Policy Network and the Friedrich Naumann Foundation.

In 2010, a joint University of Pennsylvania–United Nations University index called the 2010 Global Go-To Think Tank Report ranked IDEAS as the 18th best new think tank in the world and the second best new think tank in Asia.

Wau Bebas Logo
IDEAS’ logo is the wau bulan that flies freely in the sky – hence its name “Wau Bebas” or the Kite of Freedom. The traditional Wau Bebas motif symbolises IDEAS’ belief that the principles of Rule of Law (Kedaulatan Undang-Undang), Limited Government (Kerajaan Terhad), Free Markets (Pasaran Bebas), and Free Individuals (Individu Merdeka), are deeply rooted in Malaysia’s tradition and heritage.

Their task is to rediscover these truly Malaysian values and to re-present them to contemporary Malaysian society so that their heritage will help Malaysia to prosper in a globalised world. A wau is only complete and functional when it is rooted to the ground via a string, depicting our call for abidance to the rule of law within a small, limited state.

Philosophy

Rule of Law
Rule of Law: Those who are ruling the society and those in positions of power are not the ultimate source of authority. They too are subject and accountable to the law. As libertarians IDEAS call for everyone to be subjected to the same set of rules and laws, with no one being above the law. IDEAS believe a system of government in which all persons, including those in positions of power, are accountable under the law is the best safeguard against dictatorship and totalitarianism.

Limited Government
Limited Government: The government is an institution to which citizens delegate the authority to rule. It is that delegation that gives government its power. But the government is a powerful institution and it can easily become a dangerous one, especially when it coerces citizens into obedience, subverting the very people who bestowed upon them the authority to rule. To prevent such coercion, the powers of the government must be limited, usually through a written constitution that both enumerates and limits executive power with checks and balances.

Free Market
Free Market: is a summary term for an array of exchanges that take place in society which respects and enforces private property rights. Each exchange is undertaken as a voluntary agreement between two people or between groups of people and/or their agents. All parties undertake the exchange because each expects to gain from it. Also, each will repeat the exchange next time (or refuse to) because his expectation has proved correct (or incorrect) in the recent past. Trade, or voluntary exchange, is engaged in precisely because both parties benefit; if they did not expect to gain, they would not agree to the exchange. Government intervention only makes exchanges involuntary and the market unfree.

Individual Liberty
Individual Liberty: Society or ‘the collective’ is in reality a collection of individuals. Each individual must respect the dignity of other individuals regardless of race, religion or gender. This means respecting the differences between people and not trying to impose uniformity. It also implies that individuals have both rights and responsibilities, such as the right to be respected by others, and the responsibility to respect others.

References

External links 
 www.ideas.org.my Official website

Think tanks established in 2010
2010 establishments in Malaysia
Non-profit organisations based in Malaysia
Think tanks based in Malaysia
Libertarian think tanks
Classical liberalism